{{Automatic taxobox
| image =
| image_caption =
| display_parents = 3
| taxon = Zitha
| authority = Walker, 1866
| synonyms = 
Koremalepis	Hampson, 1891
Sphalerosticha	Warren, 1897
Tegulifera	Saalmüller, 1880
| type_species = Zitha punicealis
| type_species_authority = Walker, 1866
}}Zitha is a genus of snout moths.

Species
Some species of this genus are:
(incomplete list)Zitha absconsalis 	Leraut, 2011Zitha adjunctalis 	Leraut, 2007Zitha agnielealis 	Leraut, 2011Zitha albostrigalis Saalmüller, 1880Zitha allutalis (Zeller, 1852)Zitha alticolalis 	Leraut, 2011Zitha ambatosoratralis 	Leraut, 2008Zitha ambinanitalis 	(Viette, 1960)Zitha ambodirianalis 	Leraut, 2011Zitha ambralis 	Leraut, 2011Zitha ankafinalis 	Leraut, 2007Zitha ankasokalis (Viette, 1960)Zitha anneliese 	(Viette, 1981)Zitha barbutalis  Leraut, 2008Zitha belalonalis 	Leraut, 2011Zitha betsakotsakoalis 	Leraut, 2011Zitha bombycalis 	Leraut, 2007Zitha capuronalis 	(Viette, 1960)Zitha catochrysalis 	(Ragonot, 1891)Zitha cyanealis 	(Mabille, 1879)Zitha decrepis 	(Viette, 1989)Zitha deuvealis  Leraut, 2009Zitha didyalis 	Leraut, 2008Zitha gallienalis 	Viette, 1960Zitha geometralis 	Leraut, 2007Zitha gueneealis 	Leraut, 2011Zitha herbulotalis 	(Marion, 1954)Zitha hiarakalis 	Leraut, 2011Zitha hongalis 	Leraut, 2011Zitha ignalis (Guenée, 1854)Zitha joannisalis 	Leraut, 2008Zitha lalannealis 	Leraut, 2009Zitha laminalis (Guenée, 1854)Zitha lanitralis 	Viette, 1978Zitha legrandalis 	Leraut, 2009Zitha lignosalis 	(Viette, 1960)Zitha luquetalis 	Leraut, 2011Zitha maesalis 	Leraut, 2007Zitha mangindranoalis 	Leraut, 2008Zitha mantasoalis 	Leraut, 2011Zitha marionalis 	(Viette, 1960)Zitha martinealis 	Leraut, 2011Zitha matsaboryalis 	Leraut, 2011Zitha millotalis 	Viette, 1960Zitha minetalis 	Leraut, 2008Zitha mixtalis 	Leraut, 2011Zitha montreuilalis 	Leraut, 2009Zitha munroealis 	Leraut, 2008Zitha navattealis 	Leraut, 2008Zitha noctualis 	Leraut, 2007Zitha nosivolalis 	(Viette, 1960)Zitha novembralis 	Leraut, 2009Zitha nussalis 	Leraut, 2011Zitha oecophoralis 	Leraut, 2007Zitha panemerialis 	Leraut, 2007Zitha pernalis 	(Viette, 1960)Zitha pronubalis 	(Marion & Viette, 1956)Zitha punicealis Walker, 1866Zitha pyraustalis 	Leraut, 2007Zitha radamalis 	(Viette, 1960)Zitha ragonotalis 	(Viette, 1960)Zitha ranaivosoloalis 	Leraut, 2011Zitha rosalinde 	Viette, 1981Zitha rubicundalis 	Saalmüller, 1880Zitha sahafaryalis 	Leraut, 2011Zitha sakavondroalis 	Leraut, 2008Zitha sambavalis 	Leraut, 2009Zitha sanguinalis 	(Marion, 1954)Zitha saturninalis 	Leraut, 2011Zitha secundalis 	Leraut, 2008Zitha sogalis 	(Viette, 1960)Zitha sublignosalis 	Leraut, 2011Zitha subcupralis (Zeller, 1852)Zitha subochracea (Warren, 1897)Zitha subradamalis 	Leraut, 2011Zitha subvinosalis 	Leraut, 2011Zitha tertialis 	Leraut, 2008Zitha torridalis  (Lederer, 1863)Zitha tortricoidalis 	Leraut, 2007Zitha toulgoetalis 	Leraut, 2009Zitha touretalbyalis 	Leraut, 2008Zitha tsarafidyalis 	Leraut, 2011Zitha tsaratananalis 	Leraut, 2011Zitha viettealis 	Leraut, 2009Zitha vieualis 	Leraut, 2011Zitha vincentalis 	Leraut, 2009Zitha vinosalis 	Leraut, 2011Zitha whalleyalis 	(Viette, 1960)Zitha zombitsalis'' 	'Viette, 1960)

References
Walker, 1866. List of the Specimens of Lepidopterous Insects in the Collection of the British Museum. Part XXXIV.– Supplement Part 4: 1264.

Phycitini
Pyralidae genera
Taxa named by Francis Walker (entomologist)